Hayley Kristen Matthews (born 19 March 1998) is a Barbadian sportswoman. She plays international cricket for the West Indies as an all-rounder, batting right-handed and bowling right-arm off break. She plays domestic cricket for Barbados, Barbados Royals and Melbourne Renegades, and has previously played for Tasmania, Lancashire Thunder, Southern Vipers, Loughborough Lightning, Velocity and Hobart Hurricanes. She has also represented Barbados in the javelin throw at several international track and field competitions. In June 2022, Matthews was named as the captain of the West Indies women's cricket team, taking over from Stafanie Taylor.

Early life and education
Matthews was born in Barbados and raised in Bridgetown, its capital and largest city. Her father, Mike, batted at no. 4 and bowled off-breaks for Pickwick Cricket Club, one of the island's leading clubs. Previously, he had played in the Barbados Under-19 team.

An early memory for Matthews is joining in on games of cricket between her father and older brother, Wayne, at home after school. She also recalls being taken with Wayne to the Pickwick Club's then home ground, Kensington Oval, where they would run around the ground, and onto the field during breaks.

After Matthews started attending People's Cathedral Primary School, which was next door to her home, an opportunity arose for her to play the game formally. At the age of eight or nine, she asked the school's boys' team coach whether she could be a member of the team. Her request was granted. By the time she was 11 years old, she had become the team's captain.

At the end of her primary school years, Matthews did well enough in Barbados's controversial Common Entrance examinations to be accepted into the island's most prestigious secondary school, Harrison College, which was founded as an all-boys school in 1733. Although the College has charged no fees since the 1960s, and has been co-educational since 1980, it is often referred to as the 'Eton College of Barbados'. Its many sporting alumni include Sir Pelham ("Plum") Warner, the "Grand Old Man" of English cricket, and Sir Clyde Walcott.

Soon after starting at Harrison College, Matthews joined the school's previously all-boys' Under-13 team as an opening batter. With her assistance, the team immediately won a tournament. In her final year as an Under-13 player, she captained the team, the first female to do so.

Matthews recommends that talented young female cricketers play in boys' teams. She believes that her experiences in such teams assisted her with facing fast bowling, and improved her fielding. At the age of 18, she had already played in the Men's First Division for the Pickwick Club, alongside male players including West Indies batter Shai Hope. As of 2022, she was still in contact with most of the male players she used to captain in her Under-13 team.

Cricket career
Matthews made her debut for the Barbadian cricket team at the age of 12. Her international debut for the West Indies came at the age of 16, in a Twenty20 International against New Zealand in September 2014. Matthews made her One Day International (ODI) debut a few months later, scoring 55 runs from 86 balls in the first game of a four-ODI series against Australia. In the second game, she scored 89 runs from 108 balls, and in the third game, 60 runs from 81 balls. Matthews has been a regular for the West Indies since her debut, and was a key member of the team that won the 2016 World Twenty20, scoring 66 runs from 45 balls in the final.

Outside of playing for the West Indies, Matthews spent the 2015–16 season playing domestic cricket in Australia, representing the Tasmanian Roar in the Women's National Cricket League and the Hobart Hurricanes in the inaugural season of the Women's Big Bash League. In one WBBL match against the Melbourne Stars, she scored 77 runs from 51 balls.

On September 22, 2018, Matthews scored her maiden ODI hundred against South Africa in the 3rd ODI, in front of her home crowd as Bridgetown. She has scored a duck in the opening match of the series and, after a wash-out in the second ODI, Matthews struck 17 fours in her 146-ball 117 as West Indies piled up 292 after opting to bat.

After losing her opening partner Kycia Knight in the third over, Matthews played the starring role in a 176-run second-wicket partnership with the captain Stafanie Taylor (46) to set the base for a high-scoring finish to their innings, after which Deandra Dottin came in at No. 4 to smash a rapid 44-ball 59 - including three sixes – to take West Indies close to the 300-run mark. West Indies went on to win the match by 115 runs, and level the ODI series 1–1.

In October 2018, Cricket West Indies (CWI) awarded her a women's contract for the 2018–19 season. Later the same month, she was named in the West Indies' squad for the 2018 ICC Women's World Twenty20 tournament in the West Indies. Ahead of the tournament, she was named as the player to watch in the team, and was appointed vice-captain of the team.

In November 2018, she was named in the Hobart Hurricanes' squad for the 2018–19 Women's Big Bash League season. In January 2020, she was named in West Indies' squad for the 2020 ICC Women's T20 World Cup in Australia. In September 2020, in the third match against England, Matthews took her 50th wicket in WT20Is. In 2021, she was drafted by Welsh Fire for the inaugural season of The Hundred.

In May 2021, Matthews was awarded with a central contract from Cricket West Indies. In October 2021, she was named in the West Indies team for the 2021 Women's Cricket World Cup Qualifier tournament in Zimbabwe. In February 2022, she was named in the West Indies team for the 2022 Women's Cricket World Cup in New Zealand.

In April 2022, she was bought by the Welsh Fire for the 2022 season of The Hundred in England. In July 2022, she was named as the captain of the Barbados team for the cricket tournament at the 2022 Commonwealth Games in Birmingham, England.

International centuries

One Day International centuries

T20 International centuries

Athletics career
As an athlete, Matthews competes in the javelin throw, and has represented Barbados in a number of international meets and competitions. She won silver medals at the 2013 and 2014 CARIFTA Games, competing in the under-17 and under-18 categories, respectively. At the 2014 Central American and Caribbean Junior Championships in Athletics, held in Mexico, she won a bronze medal in the under-18 category, while at the 2015 CARIFTA Games she won her first gold medal, again competing in the under-18 category.

References

External links

 
 

1998 births
Living people
Barbadian women cricketers
Barbadian javelin throwers
West Indian women cricketers
West Indies women One Day International cricketers
West Indies women Twenty20 International cricketers
Tasmanian Tigers (women's cricket) cricketers
Hobart Hurricanes (WBBL) cricketers
Lancashire Thunder cricketers
Southern Vipers cricketers
Loughborough Lightning cricketers
IPL Velocity cricketers
Welsh Fire cricketers
IPL Trailblazers cricketers
Mumbai Indians (WPL) cricketers
Barbados Royals (WCPL) cricketers
Melbourne Renegades (WBBL) cricketers
Cricketers at the 2022 Commonwealth Games
Commonwealth Games competitors for Barbados
Barbados women Twenty20 International cricketers
Barbadian expatriate sportspeople in England
Barbadian expatriate sportspeople in Australia
Cricketers from Bridgetown
Barbadian expatriate sportspeople in India
Barbadian expatriate sportspeople in Wales